Mansi is a town in Bhamo District, Kachin State of the northernmost part of Burma. Mansi is connected by the National Highway 31 from the south and is the western terminus of the National Road 36 which connects Mansi to Muse on the Chinese border in the east.

References

External links

Satellite map at Maplandia.com

Populated places in Kachin State
Township capitals of Myanmar